St Hilda's College may refer to:

 St Hilda's College, Oxford, one of the constituent colleges of the University of Oxford in the United Kingdom
 St. Hilda's College, Toronto, the women's section of the University of Trinity College, itself a federated college of the University of Toronto in Canada
 St Hilda's College (University of Melbourne), a residential college at the University of Melbourne in Australia

See also 
 St. Hilda's (disambiguation)